Scopula pulverosa is a moth of the  family Geometridae. It is found in India.

References

Moths described in 1934
Taxa named by Louis Beethoven Prout
pulverosa
Moths of Asia